Shilla may refer to:

Geography
 Shilla or Silla, an ancient Korean kingdom   (57 BC – 936 AD)
 Shilla District, one of eleven districts of Carhuaz (Peru)
 Shilla (mountain), a mountain peak in Himachal Pradesh, India, close to the India–Tibet border
 Shilla Col, a col in the remote Trans-Himalayan region of Spiti, Himachal Pradesh, India

Other
 Illiasu Shilla, a Ghanaian footballer
 Shilla (social grouping) of close friends of similar age, background, in Egypt or Saudi Arabia
 Hotel Shilla, also known as "The Shilla", South Korean operator of luxury hotels
 Shilla (genre), a genre of music originating from the Middle East

See also
 Silla (disambiguation)